GOELRO was the first Soviet plan for national economic recovery and development. It became the prototype for subsequent Five-Year Plans drafted by Gosplan. GOELRO is the transliteration of the Russian abbreviation for "State Commission for Electrification of Russia" (Государственная комиссия по электрификации России).

The Commission and Plan were initiated and supervised by Vladimir Lenin. Lenin's belief in the central importance of electrification to the achievement of communism is represented by his statement that

The commission was established by the Presidium of the VSNKh on February 21, 1920, in accordance with February 3, 1920, VTsIK resolution on the electrification plan development. The director of the commission was Gleb Krzhizhanovsky.  About 200 scientists and engineers participated, including Genrikh Graftio, Ivan Alexandrov, Mikhail Shatelen and others. By the end of 1920 the Commission devised the "Russian SFSR Electrification Plan", that was approved subsequently by the 8th Congress of Soviets on December 22, 1920, and accepted by the Sovnarkom (Soviet government) on December 21, 1921.

The Plan represented a major restructuring of the Soviet economy based on total electrification of the country.  Lenin's stated goal for it was "...the organization of industry on the basis of modern, advanced technology, on electrification which will provide a link between town and country, will put an end to the division between town and country, will make it possible to raise the level of culture in the countryside and to overcome, even in the most remote corners of land, backwardness, ignorance, poverty, disease, and barbarism."

Foreign authors about the plan

In 1920, British writer Herbert George Wells visited Soviet Russia and met with Vladimir Lenin. Wells believed that it was impossible to realise the Russian revolutionary’s plan, as he wrote in his book Russia in the Shadows:

"Interestingly, Herbert Well revisited the Soviet Union in 1934 and was really astonished with what he saw" - Yelena Kosheleva, Head of Mosenergo’s Museum Group, noted, when Mosenergo PLC had published a book called "GOELRO: 100 Years On", prior to the anniversary.

Implementation
The GOELRO Plan was implemented during a 10- to 15-year period. According to the Plan, the territory of the Russian SFSR was divided into eight regions, with distinct development strategies due to the specific features of each region: Southern Region, Central Industrial region, Northern Region, Ural Region, Volga Region, Turkestan Region, Caucasus Region and Western Siberia Region.  The Plan included the construction of a network of 30 regional power plants, including ten large hydroelectric power plants, and numerous electric-powered large industrial enterprises. 

It was intended to increase the total national power output per year to 8.8 billion kWh, as compared to 1.9 billion kWh in Imperial Russia in 1913. Soviet propaganda declared the plan was basically fulfilled by 1931. While only three out of ten hydroelectric stations were built by 1930: the Volkhov, the Svir, and the Dnieper Hydroelectric Stations; the goal of 8.8 billion kWh was reached in 1931, and national power output continued to increase significantly. It reached 13.5 billion kWh by the end of the first five-year plan in 1932, 36 billion kWh by 1937, and 48 billion kWh by 1940.

Ivan Alexandrov later directed the Regionalisation Commission of Gosplan which divided the Soviet Union into thirteen European and eight Asiatic economic regions, using rational economic planning rather than "the vestiges of lost sovereign rights".

The term "Ilyich's lamp" (лампочка Ильича) for an electric bulb, a reference to Vladimir Ilyich Lenin, is a reminder of the Plan period.

References

External links
 85th anniversary of GOELRO plan at the website of RAO UES
Map of the electrification from the Great Soviet Encyclopedia

Documents of the Soviet Union
Economic history of the Soviet Union
1920 establishments in Russia
1920s economic history
1920 documents